Wayne Simpson (born November 19, 1989) is an American professional ice hockey winger who is currently playing for ERC Ingolstadt of the Deutsche Eishockey Liga (DEL).

Playing career
Undrafted out of college, Simpson joined the South Carolina Stingrays in the ECHL. During his time with the Stingrays, Simpson set a new ECHL record for most points in a playoff year during the 2015 Kelly Cup playoffs. He was loaned to the Providence Bruins during the 2014–15 season before signing a one-year contract with the Portland Pirates the following season. Simpson re-signed with the Bruins before the 2016–17 season.

As a free agent, Simpson secured his first NHL contract in signing a one-year, two-way contract with the Washington Capitals on July 11, 2017. After attending the Capitals training camp, Simpson was reassigned to AHL affiliate, the Hershey Bears for the 2017–18 season. Simpson maintained his offensive game with the Bears, playing on a scoring line and finishing third on the team in points with 42, while appearing in every game (76), unable to earn a recall to the Capitals.

Un-signed from the Capitals, Simpson as a free agent opted to continue in the AHL joining his fourth club in the Rochester Americans on a one-year contract on August 16, 2018. Simpson continued to be an offensive presence in the AHL during the 2018–19 season, posting 21 goals and 45 points appearing in 72 regular season games.

After five seasons in the AHL, Simpson left as a free agent and opted to sign abroad in agreeing to a one-year contract with German club, ERC Ingolstadt of the DEL, on July 9, 2019.

Personal life
Simpson comes from a hockey-playing family; his father and both his siblings played collegiate hockey and his grandfather was the athletic director at Boston University.

Career statistics

References

External links

1989 births
Living people
American men's ice hockey right wingers
Hershey Bears players
ERC Ingolstadt players
Providence Bruins players
Portland Pirates players
Rochester Americans players
South Carolina Stingrays players
Union Dutchmen ice hockey players